Kolkhoznaya Akhtuba is a rural locality (a settlement) and the administrative center of Akhtubinskoye Rural Settlement, Sredneakhtubinsky District, Volgograd Oblast, Russia. The population was 1,261 as of 2010. There are 33 streets.

Geography 
Kolkhoznaya Akhtuba is located 5 km west of Srednyaya Akhtuba (the district's administrative centre) by road. Meliorator is the nearest rural locality.

References 

Rural localities in Sredneakhtubinsky District